Elachista adelpha is a moth of the family Elachistidae. It is found in the northern Caucasus.

References

adelpha
Moths described in 1994
Moths of Asia